Samiri or the Samiri is a phrase used by the Quran to refer to a rebellious follower of Moses who created the golden calf and attempted to lead the Hebrews into idolatry. According to the twentieth chapter of the Quran, Samiri created the calf while Moses was away for 40 days on Mount Sinai, receiving the Ten Commandments. In contrast to the account given in the Hebrew Bible, the Quran does not blame Aaron for the calf’s creation.

In the Quran

In Ta-Ha, the Quran’s twentieth surah, Moses is informed that Samiri has led his people astray in Moses’ absence. He returns to his people to berate them, and is informed of what Samiri has done.

In Islamic tradition

The Quran’s statement that Samiri’s calf made a "lowing" sound has resulted in much speculation. A number of Islamic traditions say that the calf was made with dust trodden upon by the horse of the angel Gabriel, which had mystical properties. Some traditions say that the calf could also move, a property granted to it by the dust of the “horse of life”. Other traditions suggest that Samiri made the sound himself, or that it was only the wind. Still others say that the calf was formed by God himself, as a test for the Hebrew people.

Later traditions expand upon the fate of those who worshiped the calf. Works by al-Tabari include a story in which Moses orders his people to drink from the water into which the calf had been flung; those guilty of worshiping it were revealed when they turned a golden hue.

Samiri's punishment has been interpreted as total social isolation by most scholars.

Identity

Scholars of Islam have linked Samiri to various individuals mentioned in the Bible. As-Samiri is typically translated as "the Samaritan", with the episode being seen as an explanation for the separation between Samaritans and non-Samaritans. The story parallels the Biblical narrative of the golden calves built by Jeroboam of Samaria. Samiri has been linked to the rebel Hebrew leader Zimri on the basis of their similar names and a shared theme of rebellion against Moses’ authority. Others link him to the Mesopotamian city of Samarra and suggest that he came from a cow-worshiping people, giving his name as Musa bin Zafar. Abraham Geiger proposed the idea that Samiri is a corruption of Samael, the name of an angel with similar functions to Satan in Jewish lore. There is no consensus among Islamic scholars on which, if any, of these identifications is correct.

In the Baháʼí Faith
The Baháʼí Faith portrays Samiri as a magician who led people away from the “knowledge and justice” of Moses to ignorance. He is mentioned in the “Kitáb-i-Íqán”, the primary theological work of the Baháʼí religion.

See also
 Moses in Islam
 Aaron
 Golden calf

References

Ancient Egyptian Jews
People of the Quran
Tribe of Simeon
Golden calf